The Socially Distant Sports Bar is a comedy/sports podcast hosted by sports journalist and academic Steffan Garrero with comedians Elis James and Mike Bubbins. It was created in response to the lack of live sport during the COVID-19 pandemic.

Premise

Each of the presenters picks a short clip, then take turns to pick a feature-length documentary, followed by a second short clip each, ending with one of them choosing a book (originally three books were discussed) all related to sport. They discuss the clips, documentary and book as well as taking various detours to discuss a diverse range of subjects loosely related to the original clips. Since March 2021 the second round of clips have only been available to Patreon subscribers.

Reception

The podcast was included in The Telegraph's 50 Best Cultural Events of 2020 poll, being praised for its "unreasonably hilarious lockdown laughs".  In January 2021 the Podcast won a Pod Bible poll winners award for best podcast in the Sport & Leisure category.  In February 2022 the podcast was nominated for Best Comedy Sports Podcast at the Sports Podcast awards an award they subsequently won.

The podcast has been commended for 'giving back' to the sporting community in Wales and sponsor a number of sports clubs including Cardiff Met Ladies and the academy sides at Carmarthen Town.

It is rumoured that the podcast has sent out upwards of 4 mugs to share amongst 3000 patreons.

2021 UK Tour
In April 2021 it was announced that the podcast would tour the UK in the Autumn of that year, visiting venues including The Hackney Empire, The Lowry in Salford and Cardiff's New Theatre.  Following the original tour selling well, (including having multiple shows at Hackney and Cardiff) an extra arena show was added at Cardiff's Motorpoint Arena in February 2022.  This show was re-arranged for February 2023 due to the continuing COVID-19 pandemic.

Down The Clubhouse
Following the positive reception to the podcast the team were given the opportunity by BT Sport to take the format to television.  In 2022 they recorded eight episodes of 'Down The Clubhouse' using the same format of choosing sport related video clips and discussing them. The show was filmed on location at the clubhouse of Cowbridge RFC in the Vale of Glamorgan in the spring of 2022 and aired through the summer of 2022.

Episodes

Bubbins Bulls**t

During episode 121, Mike inducted a new segment of the show for clips that he keeps meaning to discuss on the podcast but forgets about, this was to be known as "Bubbins Bulls**t"  acknowledging that some of the BS that Mike mentions is worth remembering for future episodes. The first of these was Tom Brady throwing The Vince Lombardi Trophy between boats celebrating Tampa Bays win at Super Bowl LV.

Michael Owen's Movie Club Patreon Specials

In July 2020, in addition to bonus Patreon content on the main podcast a sister podcast, “Michael Owen's Movie Club” was introduced, the hosts watch a fictional sporting themed film and discuss it. The title comes from Michael Owen’s admission that he has only ever seen 8 films and didn't like them because they aren't real.

Pint Sized Distant Pod

In November 2022, the podcast started to look back through their archive of episodes and selected some favourite stories, anecdotes and funny bits.  The first clip was taken from "Episode 39: I Couldn't Bare To Think Of You Eating Cold Beans" recalling Mike's story of buying a camping stove for an optician he had just met.

References

Comedy and humor podcasts
Sports podcasts
Patreon creators
Audio podcasts
2020 podcast debuts